Jasmina Mukaetova (born December 3, 1981 in Kavadarci) is a Macedonian turbo folk and popular music singer. In 2007, she conducted a world tour, performing in front of large diaspora audience.

Jasmina Mukaetova has been involved with the Macedonian folk scene for many years. So far, she has been very successful as a singer. She was born in Kavadarci, Republic of Macedonia, where she also completed her primary music education and High School studies. She attended the University of Philosophy in Skopje.

Her first singing experience was at the famous festival Pro fest, held in Probištip, where she was awarded 'the best newcomer' by the jury and the audience. In 1998, she participated in the Macedonian pre selection for the Eurovision Song Contest – as she was concentrating on a pop singing career at the time, until 2001, when she transformed into a folk music singer. After that, many worldwide tours followed, such as in Germany, Sweden, Switzerland, and Australia.

References

External links
 Official Website 

1981 births
Living people
People from Kavadarci
Macedonian pop singers
21st-century Macedonian women singers
Macedonian folk-pop singers